Rekhviashvili is a Georgian surname. It may refer to
 Aleksandre Rekhviashvili (born 1974), retired Georgian football player
 Giorgi Rekhviashvili (born 1988), Georgian football player
 Zebeda Rekhviashvili (born 1991), Georgian judoka

Georgian-language surnames
Surnames of Georgian origin
Surnames of Abkhazian origin